Workington Academy is a mixed secondary school in Workington, Cumbria that was formed in September 2015 as a result of the merger of Southfield Technology College and Stainburn School and Science College.

History
The former school, Stainburn School and Science College, was an average sized secondary school with shared sixth form located to the north of Workington in Cumbria. The students come from both the town and several of the surrounding villages. The school had specialist status for science from 2003. The proportion of students with learning difficulties and/or disabilities(LDD) was well above average; though the proportion of students with SEN statements was is broadly average. Demographically the majority of students are White British. It was closed requiring improvement in 2015, and the student transferred into the new academy.

The school was helped through the transition period by seconded staff from William Howard Trust, and subsequently they joined that trust. The trust was renamed Cumbria Education Trust.

New building
The academy was first situated in the same Stainburn School and Science College building. It relocated to the new building, located at the same site, in March 2017. Workington Academy's new building was officially opened on Tuesday 26 September 2017 by Her Royal Highness The Duchess of Gloucester. As of 2018, both the Southfield Technology College building and the Stainburn School and Science College building have been demolished.

Cumbria Education Trust
The academy is part of the Cumbria Education Trust multi-academy trust. The trust's Chief Executive Officer is Mrs Lorrayne Hughes.

Academics
The 2018 Ofsted Report identified that the current headteacher is showing leadership, and is supported by the parents and children. It identifies that the school was not meeting government floor standards previously, and the principal problem for most pupils is raising their literacy and numeracy standards to an age appropriate level. It acknowledges that some children level cannot control their behaviour in the corridors and social areas and in some cases the classroom. Ofsted calls them 'a small disruptive minority', some teachers are targeted leading to variable quality of learning. The head has put strategies in place, and year on year the results are improving.

The Cumbria Education Trust has broadly the same curriculum in its three secondary schools, based on the principle that each child is entitled to receive the education described in the UK governments National Curriculum - the trusts plans to exceed it.

2020 Sixth form
In September 2020 a new level of co-operation starts with the initiation of the West Coast Sixth Form. Students from Whitehaven Academy and Workington wanting to enter one of the three pathways of sixth-form education (Academic, Vocational and Other), will study in a combined sixthform. There will be a free bus service between the two sites

Workington Academy Radio

Workington Academy Radio is the student radio station of Workington Academy.

They were nominated for secondary school station of the year at the Young Audio Awards in 2019 and 2020 respectively.

In 2020 the students interviewed BBC Radio 1 DJ Greg James.

Negative publicity
In July 2017, the school received negative publicity after parents and pupils reported of poor teaching on a local Facebook page, with people claiming that there were a large amount of supply teachers and pupils being allowed to play on mobile phones. The interim headteacher, Colette Macklin, promptly hit back at the claims in an interview with local newspaper News and Star.

Headteachers
 Mr Jonathan Logan (2015–2016)
 Mrs Colette Macklin (Interim, 2016–2017)
 Mr Des Bird (2018–present)

Notable former pupils

Workington Grammar School
 Prof Cliff Addison FRS FRSC FInstP, Professor of Inorganic Chemistry from 1960-78 at the University of Nottingham
 Mike Bewick FRCGP FRCP, deputy director from 2013-15 of NHS England
 Sir Tony Cunningham, Labour MP from 2001-15 for Workington
 Sir Brian Donnelly, Ambassador to Zimbabwe from 2001–04, and Ambassador to Yugoslavia from 1994–97
 Sir William Stubbs, Director of Education from 1979-88 of ILEA, Chief Executive from 1988-93 of the Polytechnic and Colleges Funding Council (PCFC) and from 1992-96 of the Further Education Funding Council for England (FEFC)
 Prof Paul Workman FRS, biochemist, Chief Executive since 2014 of the Institute of Cancer Research

Stainburn School
 Jamie Blamire, hooker for Newcastle Falcons rugby union team
 Paul Dale, Chief technology officer of ITV
 Ven Catherine Pickford, Archdeacon of Northolt
 Lee Peacock professional footballer. Manchester City, Bristol City, Carlisle United and more

References

External links 
 Workington Academy official website
 Cumbria Education Trust website

Secondary schools in Cumbria
Academies in Cumbria
Workington
Educational institutions established in 2015
2015 establishments in England